Store Bukkeholstinden is a mountain in Lom Municipality in Innlandet county, Norway. The mountain is surrounded by several other notable mountains including Bukkeholshøi to the east; Nørdre Hellstugutinden, Midtre Hellstugutinden, and Urdadalstindene to the southeast; Tverrbytthornet and Kyrkja to the south; the Tverrbottindene ridge to the southwest and west; Bukkehøe and Lindbergtinden to the northwest; and Store Styggehøe to the northeast.

This mountain is the highest among the mountains called Bukkeholstindane, and lies on a ridge between the Bukkeholsbreen glacier in the north and the Tverrbytnede valley in the south.

See also
List of mountains of Norway by height

References

Jotunheimen
Lom, Norway
Mountains of Innlandet